Chotkowo  is a village in the administrative district of Gmina Borzytuchom, within Bytów County, Pomeranian Voivodeship, in northern Poland. Prior to 1945 it was in Germany. The village has a population of 219.

See also
 History of Pomerania

References

Chotkowo